Mantaly is a town and commune in Madagascar. It belongs to the district of Ambilobe, which is a part of Diana Region. According to 2001 commune census the population of Mantaly was 14,420.

Mantaly is served by a local airport. Primary and junior level secondary education are available in town. The majority 95% of the population are farmers, while an additional 4.5% receives their livelihood from raising livestock. The most important crop is rice, while other important products are banana, coffee and sugarcane.  Services provide employment for 0.5% of the population.

References and notes 

Populated places in Diana Region